Sadio Mané is a Senegalese professional footballer who has represented the Senegal national football team as a forward since his debut in 2012. Since then, Mané has scored 34 goals in 93 international appearances, making him the country's all-time top scorer; he surpassed Henri Camara's record of 32 goals with a hat-trick against Benin in the 2023 Africa Cup of Nations qualification on 4 June 2022.

Goals 
As of match played 24 September 2022. Senegal score listed first, score column indicates score after each Mané goal.

Hat-tricks

Statistics

See also 

 List of top international men's association football goal scorers by country

References

External links 

 Sadio Mané at RSSSF

Slimani
Senegal national football team